Meditations is a 1966 album by John Coltrane. The album was considered the "spiritual follow-up to A Love Supreme." It features Coltrane and Pharoah Sanders as soloists, both playing tenor saxophones. This was the last Coltrane recording to feature his classic quartet lineup of himself, bassist Jimmy Garrison, drummer Elvin Jones and pianist McCoy Tyner (augmented here as a sextet with Sanders and second drummer Rashied Ali), as both Jones and Tyner would quit the band by early 1966. Sanders, Ali, Garrison and Coltrane's wife Alice would comprise his next group.

Alternative versions of tracks 2–5 had been recorded in September 1965 by the same musicians minus Rashied Ali and Sanders. They were later issued as First Meditations (for quartet) in 1977.

Track listing
All tracks are written by John Coltrane.

Side one
"The Father and the Son and the Holy Ghost"12:51
"Compassion"6:50

Side two
"Love"8:09
"Consequences"9:11
"Serenity"3:28

Personnel
 John Coltrane – tenor saxophone, percussion, band leader
 Pharoah Sanders – tenor saxophone, percussion
 McCoy Tyner – piano
 Jimmy Garrison – double bass
 Elvin Jones – drums
 Rashied Ali – drums

References

1966 albums
Albums produced by Bob Thiele
Avant-garde jazz albums
Free jazz albums
Impulse! Records albums
Instrumental albums
John Coltrane albums
Albums recorded at Van Gelder Studio
Hard bop albums
Modal jazz albums